Scarlett Estevez (born December 4, 2007) is an American actress. She began her career as a child actress playing Megan in the films Daddy's Home (2015) and its sequel Daddy's Home 2 (2017). Estevez went on to play Trixie on the television series Lucifer from 2016 to 2021, and Gwen on the fourth season of the Disney Channel television series Bunk'd in 2019. She starred as Violet Rodriguez / Ultra Violet in the Disney series Ultra Violet & Black Scorpion in 2022.

Life and career
Estevez was born in Los Angeles, California. She was three years old when she booked her first national commercial. She is the niece of actress Liza Weil.

Estevez's first film role was playing Ashley in the 2013 short film The Magic Bracelet, produced for the Make a Film Foundation. Later she appeared in the 2013 film And Then There Was You, and in the 2015 Nickelodeon television film The Massively Mixed-Up Middle School Mystery.

In 2015 she starred in Daddy's Home playing Megan, a role she reprised for the film's 2017 sequel Daddy's Home 2. The Hartford Courant noted of her appearance in Daddy's Home that "it has to be said that the child actors playing the kids, Megan (Scarlett Estevez) and Dylan (Owen Vaccaro) actually give real comic performances", and The Austin Chronicle review of Daddy's Home 2 singled out Estevez among the child actors in the film, noting that "while the children are mainly used as pawns in the larger power struggle, there are a couple of scenes in which Estevez has a chance to deliver some lines that are actually funny".

In March 2015 she was cast as Trixie Espinoza in the Fox television series Lucifer. She continued in the role after the show was canceled by FOX and picked up by Netflix. In 2019, she was also cast in the fourth season of the Disney Channel television comedy series Bunk'd, playing the role of Gwen, a character "who has spent her entire life living off the grid". In June 2020, it was confirmed that Lucifer would be renewed for a sixth and final season on Netflix, but Estevez appeared in a more limited capacity, as she was cast in January 2021 in the lead role of Violet Rodriguez / Ultra Violet in the Disney Channel series Ultra Violet & Black Scorpion. That series premiered on June 3, 2022.

Filmography

References

External links 
 

Living people
2007 births
21st-century American actresses
American child actresses
American film actresses
American television actresses
Place of birth missing (living people)
Actresses from Los Angeles